Petraster is a genus of extinct Asteroid echinoderm that lived from the upper Ordovician to the late Silurian. The genus has a large distribution range, fossils have been found in North America, and Australia. Based on related echinoderms, this creature was a slow moving, benthic carnivore that possibly hunted early clams and brachiopods. It also could have had a Planktonic childhood, and also could have regenerated its arms like modern day starfish.

References 

Asteroidea
Asteroidea genera
Prehistoric echinoderm genera